Himmat is a 1970 Hindi-language action film, produced by P. Mallikharjuna Rao under the Bharathi International Films banner and directed by Ravikant Nagaich. It stars Jeetendra, Mumtaz  and music composed by Laxmikant Pyarelal. The film is remake of Telugu film Adrushtavanthulu (1968).

Plot
After the death of his father, Raghu and his mother are left in a destitute way of living, which prompts him to steal food for the survival of his mother. The police then arrest him, while his mother dies in the process; before he could reach the police station he escapes and is taken in by a criminal don only to become an outlaw. When he is asked to abduct a child which results in the death of the mother, his heart changes and he decides to surrender to the law. Years later after his release from jail, Raghu (Jeetendra) challenges the Inspector Mathur (K.N. Singh) that he will go straight and he becomes a truck driver for survival with the help of his friend Tiger (Jagdeep).

While delivering goods via his truck, Raghu, the truck driver and his sidekick, Tiger, help out a young man, who turns out to be a woman in disguise named Malti (Mumtaz). Malti falls in love with Raghu and gets married. Malti soon gives birth to a baby girl, Banku (Master Bobby). Things are going well for this family when a visit from Police Inspector Mathur turns their lives upside down. For Mathur knows Raghu's criminal background and underground links, and refuses to believe that Raghu has now given up his old ways. Because of the interference of Raghu's criminal boss (Prem Chopra) and Inspector Mathur, Raghu not only loses his job but is unable to find any work, disaster strikes, contrived by the gangster who wants Raghu to reunite with them, Raghu owes some money to the local money lender Dhaniram (Asit Sen) who pressures Raghu to return his money at the instance of the boss, Dhaniram is murdered and Raghu is arrested by Inspector Mathur, but an eyewitness testifies that the murderer is some one else thus Raghu is acquitted. Thereafter Raghu"s truck is burnt by the criminals and he loses his job too as he went to jail. In desperation Raghu wants to return to the criminal world but Malti pleads with him as he is sick, and takes up a job as a dancer in a hotel, but Raghu is upset on witnessing his wife as a dancer and refrains her and himself returns to the criminal world again with a motive with the help of Mathur. Can Raghu prove to society, the law and to Malti that he has indeed reformed?

Cast
 Jeetendra as Raghu
 Mumtaz as Malti
 Prem Chopra as Boss
 K.N. Singh as Inspector Mathur
 Asit Sen as Dhaniram (The moneylender)
 Jagdeep as Tiger
 Tun Tun as Tiger's mom
 Aruna Irani as Rita
 Brahm Bhardwaj 
 Agha as Sethji
 Prabhakar Reddy as Raju
 Naaz as Bansari
 Lakshmi as item dancer
 Praveen Paul as Naaz's Mom
 Master Bobby as Banku

Soundtrack

See also
 Jeeo Aur Jeene Do
 Jawab (1970 film) 
 Kachche Heere

References

External links

1970 films
1970s Hindi-language films
Films scored by Laxmikant–Pyarelal
Hindi remakes of Telugu films
Films directed by Ravikant Nagaich